Tinsukia railway division is one of the five railway divisions under Northeast Frontier Railway zone of Indian Railways. This railway division was formed on 15 January 1958 and its headquarter is located at Tinsukia in the state of Assam of India.

Katihar railway division, Lumding railway division, Alipurduar railway division and Rangiya railway division are the other four railway divisions under NFR Zone headquartered at Maligaon, Guwahati.

List of railway stations and towns 
The list includes the stations  under the Tinsukia railway division and their station category. 

Stations closed for Passengers -

References

 
Divisions of Indian Railways
1958 establishments in Assam

Transport in Tinsukia